Didicoolum is a homestead located  in the gazetted locality of Petherick in the Australian state of South Australia.

Location
Didicoolum is located within  the state government region of the Limestone Coast at  36º 25' 24.06"S 140º 13' 55.51"E.

It is at an altitude of 32.59 metres above sea level, and is in the Hundred of Petherick.

Name
The name Didicoolum is considered to be derived from the Aboriginal word didikalam, referring to waterholes. However Professor Norman Tindale believed it is related it to tartankaram, referring to a smoke fire of the ancestral being, Karam.

References

Houses in South Australia